WZNL (94.3 FM, "The Breeze") is a radio station licensed to Norway, Michigan, United States, and serving the Norway, Iron Mountain, and Kingsford areas of Michigan's Upper Peninsula.  The station broadcasts a soft adult contemporary music format.

History
The station signed on the air as "94.3 Michigan's Northern Lites", with a soft adult contemporary format on March 15, 1990. In the early 2000s, the station flipped to a hot adult contemporary format as "Z-94.3", and later "Star 94.3" in 2003. In July 2020, WZNL dropped its hot adult contemporary and returned back to its soft adult contemporary, branded as "The Breeze".

Previous logo

References

Sources
Michiguide.com - WZNL History

External links

ZNL
Soft adult contemporary radio stations in the United States